Budăi is a commune in Taraclia District, Moldova. It is composed of two villages, Budăi and Dermengi.

References

Communes of Taraclia District